Good People is a Canadian television documentary series, which premiered in 2020 on CBC Gem. Created and hosted by author Mark Sakamoto, each episode focuses on a persistent social problem such as homelessness, gun violence, issues faced by military veterans, the proliferation of garbage or the opioid crisis, and profiles the efforts of various individuals and communities to find innovative new solutions.

The series received two Canadian Screen Award nominations at the 9th Canadian Screen Awards in 2021, for Best Factual Program or Series and Best Writing in a Factual Program or Series (Sakamoto, Nik Sexton and Tom Stanley for the episode "Between the Cracks").

References

External links

2020 Canadian television series debuts
2020s Canadian documentary television series
CBC Gem original programming
Canadian non-fiction web series
2020 web series debuts